BD-08°2823 c (also known as HIP 49067 c) is an extrasolar planet which orbits the K-type main sequence star BD-08°2823, located approximately 135 light years away in the constellation Sextans. This planet has at least one-thirds the mass of Jupiter and takes 7.8 months to orbit the star at a semimajor axis of 0.68 AU. This planet was detected by HARPS on October 19, 2009, together with 29 other planets, including BD-08°2823 b.

References

Exoplanets discovered in 2009
Exoplanets detected by radial velocity
Giant planets
Sextans (constellation)